Godfather (stylised as GodFather) is a 2022 Indian Telugu-language political action thriller film directed by Mohan Raja. It is a remake of the 2019 Malayalam film Lucifer. The film stars Chiranjeevi, Salman Khan, Nayanthara and Satya Dev. It is produced by R. B. Choudary and N. V. Prasad on Konidela Production Company and Super Good Films' banners. In the film, the supreme leader of the ruling party dies, leaving a huge vacuum, not only in the electoral and leadership sphere of the party but also that of the state. In the inevitable succession squabble the thin line that separates good and bad becomes irrecoverably blurred. Who will succeed him forms the plot.

Principal photography commenced in August 2021 with filming taking place in Hyderabad, Ooty and Mumbai. The music is composed by Thaman S with cinematography handled by Nirav Shah. Godfather was released theatrically on 5 October 2022 and opened to positive reviews from critics. With gross of over 108 Crores against a budget of 100 crores, it was a box office bomb.

Plot 

At Interpol's office in France, an officer is handing over his case about Abraham Qureshi who is a mysterious smuggler kingpin and godfather to his junior, stating that it was his only unsolvable case.

Meanwhile, in Andhra Pradesh, CM Padmakant Reddy alias "PKR", the leader of the ruling party Jan Jagruti Party (JJP), dies in the hospital while getting treated. Taking advantage of the situation and believing that it would benefit the upcoming election, acting CM Narayana Varma sends party workers to riot outside the hospital. Govardhan, a truth-seeker, records a YouTube live stream and condemns those who praise PKR, claiming that he was a puppet, during his final years in the hands of a financial syndicate, which controls the entire Indian political system. He claims that the JJP party has twice the amount of money than the entire state's treasury, and the person who replaces PKR is crucial. He lists four possible candidates during the live stream: Sathyapriya, Jaidev Das, Varma, and Brahma Teja.

Sathya is PKR's daughter married to Jaidev, a notorious and discreet drug dealer, who mainly deals with real estate and Hawala scams. He is also in contact with drug lords in Mumbai, all unknown to Sathya. Varma declares himself as the most likely successor to PKR due to his seniority in the party and particularly for his lobbying skills. Brahma, meanwhile, is PKR's first child but was kept a secret from the world, as PKR did not want the public to know that he had a son with his first wife. Govardhan describes him as the "most dangerous" person from the list and addresses him as Godfather. Brahma's past is unknown but is now known for his contract work for corporations in Chennai, all known from Govardhan's research. Meanwhile, in Mumbai, Jaidev and Varma meet the former's partner, Abdul, and tell him that PKR had given him an ultimatum, a month ago, to stop his immoral activities. With PKR's demise, Jaidev plans to fund the JJP with drug money, by offering money to the present financier. With the help of Abdul, Jaidev cuts a deal with Lukas, who agrees to transfer , every month, in exchange for importing unchecked drug contraband into Hyderabad, once the JJP wins the election. For the deal to proceed, Jaidev has to first set up a discreet drug factory. Abdul insists that the factory should be on a government-sealed roadside. At the same time, the last rites of PKR are carried out in Hyderabad, where Sathya asks Varma to forbid Brahma from taking part in the ceremony. On Varma's orders, Indrajeet attempts to hinder his way but fails. That same night, Jaidev arrives home, where he gives some malana cream to Sathya's sister Jhanvi and convenes a meeting with the JJP ministers, informing his decision to fund the party and dissolve the current ministry, which will ensure the preponement of the elections. This will allow them to take advantage on the present sympathy wave and nominate himself as the party's next CM candidate. Since the present financier is Brahma himself, Varma advises Jaidev to negotiate with Brahma, but Brahma objects to funding the party with drug money and threatens Jaidev. Enraged, Jaidev assigns Varma to bribe 140 MLAs from the party to nominate him as the CM's candidate.

Jaidev sends men to set up the drug factory. Upon knowing this, Brahma goes to the factory and kills all of them. Brahma's aide and Jaidev's mole, Koti, witnesses this and reports it to the both of them. Indrajeet is sent to detect evidence from the factory but finds nothing. From Sathya's diary, Jaidev finds out that she resents Brahma because her father gave more care for him, who was brought to their home as a child, and was the cause of a rift between her parents. Koti persuades his lover Renuka to slander Brahma. On public news, she accuses Brahma of abusing her. This creates public outrage against Brahma, who is arrested and imprisoned. In prison, Brahma gets a phone call from his next contractor and Masoom Bhai, his most trusted aide. Jaidev arranges a hit on Brahma, by sending goons into the prison, but the attempt fails.

While transferring the money to bribe the other party members in the JJP, Lukas' containers are sabotaged by Masoom Bhai. Brahma meets Govardhan, where he provides pieces of evidence of the party workers' corruption to Govardhan and also reveals the reasons for him indulging in drug trade, in Chennai. Meanwhile, Koti, who realizes his mistake, along with Renuka, admit that they lied about Brahma, on national news. Brahma is later released from prison. Meanwhile, Jhanvi is hospitalized after a drug overdose. From Jhanvi, Sathya learns of Jaidev's predatory behavior towards her. When confronted by Sathya, Jaidev admits everything and threatens to expose Jhanvi's contacts with drug peddlers. He also threatens to kill her and Jhanvi, like PKR. A changed Sathya, with no other choice, seeks the help of Brahma. Brahma, who reveals his origin to Sathya, vows to protect them. Sathya breaks down after coming to know the true face of her brother's.

Indrajeet blackmails Sathya in exchange for not filing a case against Jhanvi. Brahma kills Indrajeet, with his men, following which, Brahma meets the owners of the NNTV news channel. Brahma and Masoom Bhai also blackmail Varma and the other MLAs to ally with him in exchange for their drug habits not getting into the hands of the media. Jaidev kidnaps Jhanvi and blackmails Sathya, from Mumbai, to announce him as the next CM. With the help of Masoom Bhai, Brahma kills Jaidev's associates. They confront Jaidev, where upon seeing Brahma, Lukas reveals that Brahma is in fact, Abram Qureshi aka "Godfather". Though taken aback, Jaidev attempts to have Sathya killed in a car accident, but Brahma's men save her. Defeated, Jaidev kills himself. Sathya is elected as the new president of JJP party and CM, while Brahma heads to Paris with Masoom Bhai. After gathering all the major drug lords in the world, Brahma and Masoom Bhai kill all of them.

Cast 

 Chiranjeevi as Brahma Teja / Abram Qureshi
 Salman Khan as Masoom Bhai 
 Nayanthara as Sathyapriya "Sathya" Jaidev Das
 Satya Dev as Jaidev Das "Jai"
 Puri Jagannadh as Govardhan 
 Murali Sharma as Narayana Verma
 Tanya Ravichandran as Jhanvi
 Samuthirakani as ACP Indrajeet IPS
 Sarvadaman D. Banerjee as CM Padmakant Ramdas Reddy "PKR"
 Sunil as Koti
 Brahmaji as Narasimha Reddy
 Divi Vadthya as Renuka 
 Shafi as Murugan
 Sayaji Shinde as Bangaram Naidu
 Bharath Reddy as Ram Prasad
 Anasuya Bharadwaj as Ram Prasad's wife
 Kasthuri Shankar as Brahma's mother
 Murali Mohan as an elder man in Ashram
 Pragathi as Sowjanya
 Nawab Shah as Abdul
 Gangavva as Kanthamma
Master Yuvan as young Brahma
Ahana as young Sathya
 Prabhu Deva as himself in the song "Thaar Maar Thakkar Maar"
 Warina Hussain as a dancer in the item number "Blast Baby"

Production

Development 
The Telugu remake of the 2019 Malayalam film Lucifer was announced in April 2020 with Chiranjeevi in the lead role. Sujeeth was signed to direct the project, who had also started working on the script for the Telugu adaptation. Sujeeth opted out of the project in September 2020 due to creative differences. Later, V. V. Vinayak was approached in replace him. In December 2020, Mohan Raja was confirmed as the director, marking his return to Telugu cinema after 20 years. Hanuman Junction (2001) was his first and only Telugu film until then. The film was officially launched in January 2021 with a traditional pooja ceremony in Hyderabad. The film marks the maiden collaboration of Chiranjeevi with composer Thaman S. Nirav Shah was signed as the cinematographer. It was to be produced by Konidela Production Company and Super Good Films. The film's title was unveiled as Godfather in August 2021.

Casting 
In September 2021, Nayanthara, Biju Menon and Satyadev entered talks to sign the film. Nayanthara and Satyadev were confirmed to be a part of the film in November and the latter was signed in to play the main antagonist in this film. Gangavva plays a supporting role next to Chiranjeevi in the film. Director Puri Jagannadh had a special role in the film. Bigg Boss 4 contestant Divi Vadthya joined the film as Chiranjeevi promised her a role in the season's finale.

In August 2021, actor Salman Khan was approached to play a key role in the film. In November, Thaman confirmed that Khan would star alongside Chiranjeevi, in addition to appearing a dance number, thus marking Khan's debut in Telugu cinema. Khan reportedly portrays the role of Zayed Masood (Prithviraj Sukumaran) from Lucifer.

Filming 
Principal photography of the film began on 13 August 2021. The first schedule of the film took place in Hyderabad. The second schedule of the film began in September 2021 in Ooty. Shooting was halted in October as Chiranjeevi underwent a surgery on his right hand which was followed by a 15-day bed rest. He resumed the shoot in November 2021 in Hyderabad. In January 2022, the actor tested positive for COVID-19 and therefore had to quarantine himself. This proceeded to shoot a few crucial scenes that didn't involve him during which Nayanthara joined the production. Chiranjeevi joined the sets back in February following his recovery. Salman Khan completed filming his portions in March 2022 in a week-long schedule at ND Studios, Karjat, Mumbai. Khan also shot for a song alongside Chiranjeevi in Hyderabad under the choreography of Prabhu Deva.

Music 

The film score and soundtrack album of the film is composed by Thaman S. The music rights were acquired by Saregama. The first single titled "Thaar Maar Thakkar Maar" was released on 15 September 2022.

Release

Theatrical
Godfather was released in cinemas on 5 October 2022 in Telugu along with a Hindi dubbed version. The film is distributed in India by Konidela Production Company along with PVR Pictures while the overseas distribution is by Sarigama Cinemas through Phars Film. Worldwide theatrical rights of the film were sold at a cost of  crore. The Tamil dubbed version was released on 14 October 2022.

Home media
The film's digital streaming rights were acquired by Netflix at a cost of  crore and will stream as from November 19. It has been reported from News18 that, the film producers have been offered  crore for the satellite and digital rights for the Hindi dubbed version of this film. The film was digitally streamed on Netflix from 19 November 2022.

Reception

Critical Response
Godfather opened to positive reviews with most critics praising Chiranjeevi's performance. 

Paul Nicodemus of The Times of India gave a rating of 3.5 out of 5 stating that the film proves to be a worthy remake of the Malayalam original with Chiranjeevi coming up with a charismatic performance.  Murali Krishna CH of The New Indian Express rated the film 3.5 out of 5 stars and wrote, "Watch it definitely for the Megastar, who delivers enough bang for your buck". Arvind V of Pinkvilla rated the film 3 out of 5 stars and wrote "Chiranjeevi, after a dull performance in Acharya, is terrific here. Satyadev delivers an award-winning output". Opining the same, Manoj Kumar R of The Indian Express appreciated Mohan Raja's work and stated that he "has steered clear of mystery and has turned GodFather into a full-fledged political drama".

Roktim Rajpal of India Today rated the film 3 out of 5 and wrote, "The Chiranjeevi-led political thriller is massier and more action-packed than the Malayalam version. GodFather is a grand celebration of the brand Chiranjeevi that proves to be a treat for the veteran hero's ardent fans". The Hans India rated the film with 3 out of 5, stating that the film is a decent one-time watch and offers something to cheer for Chiranjeevi's fans. Deepa Gahlot of Rediff.com rated the film with 3/5 stars, stating the film has a gracefully aged Chiranjeevi, who plays Brahma with a quiet but menacing look keeping the audience engaged.

Sowmya Rajendran of The News Minute rated the film 2.5 out of 5  stars and wrote "Director Mohan Raja seems to have been torn between his instincts to make a solid political thriller and the compulsions to pander to his leading man’s fanbase". Abhimanyu Mathur of Hindustan Times stated that, the film works only when Chiranjeevi is on screen, with the veteran actor more than holds his own and simply carries the film with his stardom and screen presence to save the film from flaws. On the contrary, Priyanka Sundar of Firstpost rated the film 2.5 out of 5 stars and wrote "The magic touch seems to be missing in GodFather. It is certainly not a movie that would put you to sleep, however, it is neither one that would elicit excitement either".

Box Office
The film collected 108.7 Crores in it's entire theatrical run. On the first day, it collected 21.7 crores include 15.7 crores from India and 7.0 crores overseas. In it's first weekend, the film box office collection was around 77 crores. It performed well at the box office during it's first weekend but eventually ended up as a box office bomb with a worldwide gross of 108.7 crores against a budget of 100 crores.

References

External links

Telugu remakes of Malayalam films
Indian political thriller films
Films shot in Hyderabad, India
Films scored by Thaman S
Indian action thriller films
Films set in France
2020s masala films
2022 action thriller films
Films about corruption in India
Films shot at Ramoji Film City
Social realism in film
Law enforcement in fiction
Fictional portrayals of the Telangana Police
Political action films
Films shot in Mumbai
Indian action films
Fictional portrayals of the Andhra Pradesh Police
Films about social issues in India
Films shot in Telangana
Indian political drama films
Films about the Narcotics Control Bureau
Films about the illegal drug trade
Films about politicians
Films directed by Mohan Raja